Eulogies is the debut album of American indie rock group Eulogies, released by Dangerbird Records on September 11, 2007. The album was co-produced by Peter Walker and Hrishikesh Hirway (The One A.M. Radio). A music video was produced for the song "One Man."

A picture disc 7" single was released for "If I Knew You" (with the B-side "Fires Out") in limited quantities. A split single was released on 7" vinyl in 2007, featuring "If I Knew You" by Eulogies on one side, and "You're a Wolf" by Sea Wolf on the other.

Track listing
All tracks written by Peter Walker.
 "Inward" – 0:25
 "One Man" – 2:58
 "Life Boat (Suicide)" – 2:06
 "If I Knew You" – 4:30
 "Under the Knife" – 2:48
 "Can't Relate" – 4:09
 "Compromise" – 2:38
 "Running in the Rain" – 2:38
 "Useless Amends" – 3:57
 "Little Davie" – 3:39
 "Can't Relate" (Reprise) – 2:11
 "Big Eyes" – 4:07
 "Blizzard Ape" – 3:07

Personnel
 Peter Walker – vocals, guitar, keyboards
 Tim Hutton – bass, backing vocals
 Chris Reynolds – drums
 Produced by Peter Walker and Hrishikesh Hirway
 Recorded by Mike Cresswell at Sunset Sound, Hollywood, California
 Mixed by John Goodmanson at Robert Lang Studios, Seattle, Washington
 "Can't Relate" mixed by Mike Cresswell at Sunset Sound
 Mastered by Dave Cooley at Elysian Masters, Echo Park, California
 Hrishikesh Hirway – guitar on "Little Davie" and "Blizzard Ape"
 Badgie Miller – French horn on "Can't Relate"
 Engineering assistance by Clifton Allen, Graham Hope, John Ziemski, Jason Mott and Bill Mims
 Jeff Castelaz – A&R
 Aaron Burtch – art
 Art and design by Sara Cumings

References

2007 debut albums
Eulogies (band) albums